Slate is a type of rock, often used for roofing.

Slate may also refer to:

Places
Slate, Virginia, an unincorporated community in the United States
Slate, West Virginia, an unincorporated community in the United States
Slate Run, a tributary of Pine Creek in Pennsylvania

People
Slate (surname)

Arts, entertainment, and media
Slate (magazine), an online publication
"Slate", a song by Uncle Tupelo from the album Anodyne
Slates (EP), an EP by The Fall

Government and politics
Slate (elections), a group of candidates in a multi-seat or multi-position election
SLATE (1958–1966), a campus political party at the University of California, Berkeley

Technology

Electronics and internet
HP Slate 500, a Windows 7 tablet computer manufactured by Hewlett-Packard
Slate PC, a Microsoft Tablet PC running Windows 7
Slate phone, a smartphone form factor
Slate tablet, a tablet computer form factor
SLATES, the business impacting capabilities of Web 2.0
Pixel Slate, a Google tablet computer

Other technologies
Slate (writing), a board for writing on
Slate board (clapperboard), a device used during film production
Slate (broadcasting), a title card listing important metadata of a television program
Slate and stylus, tools used by blind persons to write and read

Other uses
Slate (typeface), a neo-grotesque typeface
Slate gray, a color
Slate turkey, a breed of domestic fowl

See also
Magic slate
Slate Creek (disambiguation)